Skoki is a town in Greater Poland Voivodeship, west-central Poland.

Skoki may also refer to:

 Skoki, Złotów County in Greater Poland Voivodeship
 Skoki, Puławy County in Lublin Voivodeship (east Poland)
 Skoki, Radzyń Podlaski County in Lublin Voivodeship (east Poland)
 Skoki, Lubusz Voivodeship (west Poland)
 Skoki, Świętokrzyskie Voivodeship (south-central Poland)
 Skoki, Szczecin
 Skoki, Belarus, in the Brest District of Belarus
 Skoki Formation, in Canada

Note 
 The name is not related to that of Skokie, Illinois which is of Native American origin.